Jaras may refer to:

Járás, a type of administrative subdivision of Hungary equivalent to district
Jaras TV, Al Jaras TV, a TV station of Lebanon
Al Jaras, a magazine, Lebanon
Jerash, Jaras  was an old name for this Jordanian village
 , Lithuanian stage and TV actor and stage director